John Butterfield (30 August 1922 – March 2001) was an English professional footballer who played as a defender. He made three appearances in the Football League in the 1947–1948 season before being forced to retire due to an injury.

References

External links
Jack Butterfield profile at clarets-mad.co.uk

1922 births
English footballers
Association football defenders
Burnley F.C. players
Tamworth F.C. players
English Football League players
2001 deaths